The Proton X50 is a subcompact crossover SUV produced by the Malaysian car maker Proton. Marketed as a B-segment SUV, the vehicle was revealed on 15 September 2020 and was launched on 27 October 2020. The model is the second SUV from the brand after the X70. The vehicle is a rebadged Geely Binyue with several changes, including the right-hand drive conversion and several mechanical adjustments.

Overview 
Following the purchase of Proton by Geely in 2017, Proton has secured the intellectual properties to the design, development, manufacture, sale, marketing and distribution of the Geely Binyue alongside the Boyue (X70) and Jiaji. Camouflaged prototypes were seen being tested on public roads in Malaysia since February 2019.

As the Geely Binyue, the car is underpinned with the same BMA platform jointly developed by Geely and Volvo. The exterior design development of the Binyue was led by Jamie Barrett. Proton's head designer and Geely claimed that the design of the vehicle was inspired by a fighter jet.

As opposed to the X70 which was initially imported from China, the X50 is built in Proton plant in Tanjung Malim from day one with a local content of 40 percent and contains 406 parts specific to the X50. The first unit rolled off the assembly line on 15 September 2020.

At launch, the X50 was available in four trims, which are Standard, Executive, Premium, and Flagship.

Powertrain 
The X50 is offered with two engine options in Malaysia, both are 1.5-litre three-cylinder unit with turbocharger coded JLH-3G15TD jointly co-developed by Geely and Volvo. The port-injection engine variant is available as standard, and the direct-injection engine for the Flagship variant.

Safety 
The X50 is equipped with four airbags, vehicle stability control, hill start assist, hill descent control and rear ISOFIX child seat anchors as standard. Upper trims would receive six airbags and a tire pressure monitoring system, while the Flagship trim gained the Advanced Driving Assistance System (ADAS) safety suite which includes adaptive cruise control with stop and go function, lane centring assist, autonomous emergency braking with pedestrian detection, lane keeping assist, blind spot monitoring and automatic high beam.

Export

Mauritius 
The X50 is sold in Mauritius since February 2022 after an announcement was made in November 2021 with pre-orders in December 2021.

South Africa
On May 31, 2022, Proton has shipped some X50 units to South Africa alongside the Proton X70 and Proton Saga.

Sales

References

External links 

Official website

Proton vehicles
Cars introduced in 2020
Front-wheel-drive vehicles
Mini sport utility vehicles
Crossover sport utility vehicles
ASEAN NCAP small family cars